The Rugby League World Golden Boot Award is a rugby league award handed out annually for achievements in rugby league by Rugby League World magazine. The Golden Boot is given, usually in December after the conclusion of all the year's matches, to the player adjudged to be the best in the world, as determined by a ballot of international media representatives.

The Rugby League International Federation (RLIF) announced that the 2018 awards will be extended to include a Golden Boot for the best international female player.  The inaugural award was won by Isabelle Kelly, the Australia and Sydney Roosters .

History

The award was founded in early 1985 by the British magazine Open Rugby and was awarded to Wally Lewis for his performances throughout 1984. Lewis and the other pre-1990 winners were initially recognised for the years that they collected the award, not for the year of their performances, but this was changed by Rugby League World magazine in 2010.

No award was made between 1990 and 1998 due to organisational difficulties, the award was resurrected in its original format in 1999 when Open Rugby changed ownership to become Rugby League World Magazine, which retained ownership of the Golden Boot.

Andrew Johns collected the award in 1999 and again in 2001, becoming the first player to win it twice. Darren Lockyer repeated that feat, winning in 2003 and 2006 becoming the first player to win twice while playing in different positions.

It was presented during the RLIF Awards in 2004, 2005 and 2006. In 2007, the RLIF did not organise any awards. To fill the gap, Rugby League World magazine asked its Golden Boot panel to come up with winners in the existing categories used by the RLIF.

In 2011, Rugby League World magazine began to award retrospective Golden Boots to fill in "the missing years" starting with Garry Schofield who was adjudged to have won the 1990 Golden Boot. Schofield was due to receive the award at the time, until the sponsors, Adidas, withdrew their backing.

Winners - Men

1 The 1987 Golden Boot was shared by two winners
2 Retrospective award made in 2011

By nationality

By position

By club
NOTE: Clubs shared the award in 1984, 1985 and 1988

Multiple winners

Winners - Women

By nationality

By position

By club

See also
 RLIF Awards
 Rugby League World

References

External links
 Rugby League World Magazine

Rugby league trophies and awards